Tinsel and Lights is a Christmas album by British singer Tracey Thorn. It was released on 30 October 2012 on Buzzin' Fly Records and Merge Records. It is her fourth solo studio album.

The album mostly avoids canonical Christmas songs but instead features covers of songs by Sufjan Stevens, Joni Mitchell, Randy Newman, Ron Sexsmith and The White Stripes as well as self-penned songs. Scritti Politti's Green Gartside features on a cover of Low's "Taking Down the Tree", as well as writing "Snow in Sun". Ben Watt, who is Thorn's husband and partner in Everything but the Girl, plays on most tracks, and their three children provide backing vocals on the track "Joy".

Tinsel and Lights entered the UK Album charts at number 94 on the 10 November 2012

An expanded version was released via iTunes. In addition to the original 12 tracks, it added "25th December" (originally performed by Ben Watt on EBTG's "Amplified Heart" album) as well as acoustic versions of "Joy," "River" and "Tinsel and Lights."

Critical reception

Tinsel and Lights received many favourable reviews around the time of its release including a review in The Guardian and the BBC

Track listing

Charts

References

External links
 
 The Guardian, 25 October 2012 Alexis Petridis review
 Buzzin' Fly announcement of album
 

2012 Christmas albums
Christmas albums by English artists
Merge Records albums
Tracey Thorn albums
Pop Christmas albums